Caldicoprobacter faecalis  is a bacterium from the genus of Caldicoprobacter which has been isolated from sewage sludge.

References

 

Eubacteriales
Bacteria described in 1988
Thermophiles